The 2016 Hampton Pirates football team represented Hampton University in the 2016 NCAA Division I FCS football season. They were led by third-year head coach Connell Maynor and play their home games at Armstrong Stadium. They were a member of the Mid-Eastern Athletic Conference (MEAC). They finished the season 5–6, 5–3 in MEAC play to finish in a tie for third place.

Schedule

Source: Schedule

Game summaries

at Old Dominion

William & Mary

vs. Howard

at North Carolina A&T

at Delaware State

Morgan State

at Florida A&M

South Carolina State

Savannah State

Norfolk State

at Coastal Carolina

References

Hampton
Hampton Pirates football seasons
Hampton Pirates football